José Adolfo Murat Macías is a Mexican politician affiliated with the Institutional Revolutionary Party (PRI). As of 2003 he served as Deputy of the LIX Legislature of the Mexican Congress as a plurinominal representative from the State of Mexico (Estado de Mexico). He finished his tenure in 2006.

References

Date of birth missing (living people)
Living people
Politicians from the State of Mexico
Members of the Chamber of Deputies (Mexico)
Institutional Revolutionary Party politicians
Year of birth missing (living people)
Deputies of the LIX Legislature of Mexico